Alunu is a commune located in Vâlcea County, Oltenia, Romania. It is composed of seven villages: Alunu, Bodești, Colțești, Igoiu, Ilaciu, Ocracu and Roșia.

References

Communes in Vâlcea County
Localities in Oltenia